Martin Saar (born 30 April 1980) is an Estonian artist who currently lives and works between New York City and Tallinn, Estonia.

Life and work
Saar was born in Tallinn, Estonia.

He gained his MA in drawing at the New York Academy of Art in 2014 after studying at Kevade Street Art School and in 2002 graduating from Estonian Academy of Arts.

Saar's work encompasses mosaics, paintings and watercolors as well as digital collages and videos. His work is informed by his love for music, which is translated into radical colors and expressive gestures. Saar's tile series is an example of his evocative use of brushstroke condensed onto a small scale while his large-scale monochromatic paintings reflect on memories of his family life before Estonia's independence in 1991.

Saar gained recognition as an artist for his mosaic paintings of New York celebrities, which were featured in The New York Times.

General references
 Fashionweekdaily, April 10, 2007 
 Postimees, Arter, May 6, 2006
 Sirp, May 5, 2006
 * WWD, April 10, 2006
 New York Times, Sunday Style section, March 12, 2006
 Absolute New York Magazine summer 2005 issue
 A&F Magazine summer 2005 issue
 Stiil Magazine, April 2005 issue
 Dan's Papers, December 3, 2004
 The East Hampton Star, December 2, 2004
 Eesti Ekspress, October 28, 2004

References

External links
 Martin Saar
 Art Net

1980 births
Artists from Tallinn
Living people
Estonian expatriates in the United States
Estonian Academy of Arts alumni
21st-century Estonian painters
21st-century Estonian male artists